WGML (990 AM) was a Christian radio station broadcasting a Gospel format. Licensed to Hinesville, Georgia, United States, it served the Savannah area. The station was last owned by Powerhouse of Deliverance Church, Inc.

History
WGML began as daytime-only broadcaster in November 1958. It was originally owned by the Liberty Broadcasting Company, established by local businessmen Paul Sikes and Roscoe Denmark. During that time, it was the only station that could be heard with a strong signal at Fort Stewart. (Several Savannah stations and a Jacksonville station could be picked up during the daytime with somewhat weaker signals.) In the 1960s, the station offered a mix of middle-of-the-road music and local interest programming. The station underwent numerous format changes, from its original middle-of-the-road programming to pop/rock, country, talk, and its final format of gospel.

WGML ownership changed several times since its inception. Jim Watson, who had become the station's general manager,  bought it in 1959. It was subsequently owned by Harris Slotin, a Savannah businessman, who sold it to Dave Steele in the 1970s. It was ultimately purchased by the Powerhouse of Deliverance Church.

The first announcer/manager of WGML was Don Kordecki. In addition to Jim Watson, many local announcers were hired, particularly in its early years. Some of the local personalities were Donald Browning, David (Butch) Fulton, Gary Smiley, Bill Meacham, Dennis Eversoll, Bob Groover, and Brian Steele. Many other local persons have served in various capacities, giving the station a strong local area appeal.

WGML's license was canceled on April 2, 2020, due to the station failing to file an application for renewal of the license by April 1.

In October 2020, a man who appeared to have been having a mental breakdown climbed to the top of the station's radio tower in Hinesville, and was eventually lowered after a several hour standoff with local police and firefighters.

References

External links
FCC Station Search Details: DWGML (Facility ID: 7815)
FCC History Cards for WGML (covering 1957-1979}

GML
Radio stations established in 1958
1958 establishments in Georgia (U.S. state)
Defunct radio stations in the United States
Radio stations disestablished in 2020
2020 disestablishments in Georgia (U.S. state)
Defunct religious radio stations in the United States
GML